Amman Stand-up Comedy Festival is an international stand-up comedy festival held annually in Amman, Jordan. Among the stand-up comedians that participated in the festival include:
 Dean Obeidallah
 Ronnie Khalil
 Ali Al Sayed
 Fahad Albutairi
 Maz Jobrani
 Russell Peters
 Ali Hassan

References

External links 
 

Amman
Jordanian culture
Comedy festivals in Jordan
2008 establishments in Jordan